comeandgetit is the second EP released by American singer-songwriter Liz Phair composed of 5 out-takes from her self-titled album.  It was available as bonus material for those who purchased the album.

Release

The CD-ROM portion of the Liz Phair CD contains links to the comeandgetit site where the tracks and cover art are available for download.  The tracks are DRM protected, rendering them theoretically unrecordable. comeandgetit was available as a hard copy at select 2004 Liz Phair live shows after purchasing merchandise. Physical copies are still scarcely available. Additionally, in 2004, Capitol Records prepared a regular manufactured CD of the EP, with the same tracks, but different cover art. This CD was not intended for commercial sale, but instead for promotional distribution.

As of 2006, the EP is no longer available for digital download, even if one has a physical copy of Liz Phair. However, if the EP had already been downloaded, Windows Media Player was still able to locate and download the necessary license to play the file.

Track listing
Tracks 1–3 produced and recorded by Michael Penn and mixed by Mike Shipley. Track 4 produced by Liz Phair, recorded by Doug Boehm, and mixed by Howard Willing. Track 5 is a demo and mixed by Mike Gilnes.

Liz Phair albums
2003 EPs
Capitol Records EPs